The men's 15 kilometre + 15 kilometre double Pursuit cross-country skiing competition at the 2010 Winter Olympics in Vancouver, Canada, was held on 20 February at Whistler Olympic Park in Whistler, British Columbia, at 13:30 PST.

Summary
The 30 km double pursuit format has been competed at the world championship level since 2005 and at the Winter Olympic level since 2006. Russia's Yevgeny Dementyev was the defending Olympic champion, but didn't defend after it was reported that he tested positive to erythropoietin (EPO) in August 2009. Norway's Petter Northug was the reigning world champion. Italy's Pietro Piller Cottrer won the test event that took place at the Olympic venue on 17 January 2009. The last World Cup event prior to the 2010 Games in this format took place on 23 January 2010 in Rybinsk, Russia, and was won by Russian Artem Zhmurko. Zhrumko did not qualify for the men's cross-country team for Russia at the 2010 Winter Olympics.

The pursuit consisted of a 15 kilometre section raced in the classic style, followed by a 15 kilometre portion raced freestyle. In between the sections, each skier takes time (approximately 30 seconds) to change skis and poles.

Top three leaders after the classic portion of the event were Bauer (who finished seventh), Cologna (who finished 13th), and Olsson. Pit stop leaders were test event winner Piller Cottrer (who finished 14th), Babikov (who finished fifth), and defending World Champion Northug (who finished 11th). Hellner was Sweden's first male individual gold medalist in the traditional cross-country skiing distances at the Winter Olympics since Gunde Svan's 50 km victory at Calgary in 1988.

Results

References

External links
 2010 Winter Olympics results: Men's 30 km Pursuit (15 Classic+15 Free), from https://web.archive.org/web/20100222080013/http://www.vancouver2010.com/ retrieved 2010-02-19.

Men's cross-country skiing at the 2010 Winter Olympics
Men's pursuit cross-country skiing at the Winter Olympics